This is a list of schools of psychoanalysis.

International schools and organizations
 International Federation of Psychoanalytic Societies (IFPS)
 École Européenne de Psychanalyse (EEP) (Europe)
 International Psychoanalytical Association (founded 1910)
 La Nueva Escuela Lacaniana (NEL) (Peru, Ecuador, Venezuela, Cuba, Colombia and Miami)
 World Association of Psychoanalysis (founded 1992)
 School of Psychoanalysis of the Forums of the Lacanian Field (EPFCL-IF)
 Federation of the European Schools of Psychoanalysis (FESP)
 International Association for Relational Psychoanalysis and Psychotherapy

Argentina
 Fundación Descartes
 Escuela de la Orientación Lacaniana
 Asociación de Psicoanálisis de La Plata (La Plata)
 Foro Analítico del Río de la Plata (Buenos Aires)

Belgium 
 New Lacanian School (NLS) (Brussels)

Brazil
 Escola Brasileira de Psicanalise (EBP)
 Escola de Psicanálise dos Fóruns do Campo Lacaniano (EPFCL)
 Sociedade Brasileira de Psicanálise Integrativa (SBPI)
 Associação Brasileira de Psicanálise Insight
 Sociedade Paulista de Psicanálise
 Instituto Paulista de Psicanálise
 Escola Letra Freudiana (ELF)
 Associação Brasileira de Filosofia e Psicanálise (ABRAFP)
 Escola Freudiana de Formação em Psicanalítica (EFFP)
 Escola Lacaniana de Formação Psicanalítica (ELFP)
 Sociedade Brasileira de Psicanálise Lacaniana (SBPL)

Canada 
 Institute for the Advancement of Self Psychology (IASP)
 Toronto Institute for Contemporary Psychoanalysis (TICP)
 Toronto Psychoanalytic Society and Institute (TPS)
 The Western Branch Canadian Psychoanalytic Society (WBCPS)

Chile 
 Sociedad Chilena de Psicoanálisis-ICHPA

England
 The Institute of Psychoanalysis
 Tavistock Society of Psychotherapists

France
 Association Psychanalytique de France
 École Freudienne de Paris (1964–1980)
 École de la Cause Freudienne (ECF) (Paris)
 École Lacanienne de Psychanalyse
 Société psychanalytique de Paris
 Société psychanalytique de recherche et de formation (SPRF)

Italy
 Scuola Lacaniana di Psicoanalisi del Campo Freudiano (Rome)
 Scuola di psicoanalisi dei Forums del Campo lacaniano

Lebanon 
 Lebanese Association for the Development of Psychoanalysis (ALDeP)

Mexico
 École Lacanienne de Psychanalyse

Norway 

 Institutt for Psykoterapi
 Norsk Psykoanalytisk Institutt

Peru
 Nueva Escuela Lacaniana del Campo Freudiano (NEL) (Lima)

Portugal
 Portuguese Psychoanalytical Society

Spain
 Escuela Lacaniana de Psicoanálisis del Campo Freudiano (Barcelona)
 Escuela de Psicoanálisis de los Foros del Campo lacaniano

Sweden
 Svenska psykoanalytiska institutet (Stockholm)

Switzerland
 Institut International de Psychanalyse et de Psychothérapie Charles Baudouin (Geneva)

United States

 Academy of Clinical and Applied Psychoanalysis
 American Institute for Psychoanalysis
 Boston Graduate School of Psychoanalysis (founded 1973)
 Boston Psychoanalytic Society and Institute (founded 1931)
 California Graduate Institute (founded 1968)
 Center for Psychotherapy and Psychoanalysis of New Jersey https://cppnj.org
 Center for Modern Psychoanalytic Studies
 Chicago Institute for Psychoanalysis (founded 1932)
 Columbia University Center for Psychoanalytic Training and Research
 Denver Institute for Psychoanalysis (founded 1969)
 Emory University Emory University Psychoanalytic Institute
 International Psychotherapy Institute
 Institute for the Psychoanalytic Study of Subjectivity
 Institute of Contemporary Psychoanalysis, Los Angeles
 Institute of Contemporary Psychotherapy + Psychoanalysis, Washington, DC
 Massachusetts Institute for Psychoanalysis (founded 1987)
 Menninger Foundation (founded 1919)
 National Psychological Association for Psychoanalysis (founded 1948)
 New Center for Psychoanalysis in Los Angeles, founded 2005 from merger of the Los Angeles Psychoanalytic Society and Institute (LAPSI, founded 1946) and the Southern California Psychoanalytic Institute and Society (SCPIS, founded 1950)
 New York Psychoanalytic Society and Institute (founded 1911)
 New York University Postdoctoral Program in Psychotherapy and Psychoanalysis
 Newport Psychoanalytic Institute
 Psychoanalytic Psychotherapy Study Center, New York, NY
 San Diego Psychoanalytic Center (SDPC), founded in 1973 as the San Diego Psychoanalytic Society and Institute
 San Francisco Psychoanalytic Society and Institute (founded 1942)
 St. Louis Psychoanalytic Institute
 Western New England Institute for Psychoanalysis (founded 1952)
 William Alanson White Institute (founded 1946)

References

Psychology lists
Higher education-related lists